G. japonica  may refer to:
 Geoemyda japonica, the Ryukyu black-breasted leaf turtle or Ryukyu leaf turtle, a turtle species endemic to the Ryukyu Islands in Japan
 Gleditsia japonica, the Japanese honey locust, a tree species in the genus Gleditsia
 Gymnomacquartia japonica, a tachinid fly species
 Gyrinicola japonica, a nematode parasite species

See also
 Japonica (disambiguation)